Dicerocardium is an extinct genus of fossil saltwater clams, marine heterodont bivalve molluscs, in the family Dicerocardiidae. These bivalves were stationary semi-infaunal suspension feeders.

Distribution
Fossils of species in this genus have been found in the Triassic of Austria, Hungary, Italy and Japan.

References 

 Paleobiology Database
 EoL
 GBIF

External links 
 Milano città delle scienze

Prehistoric bivalve genera
Bivalve taxonomy